Synemon magnifica, the magnificent sun-moth, is a moth in the Castniidae family. It is found in Australia, including New South Wales.

The larvae feed on Lepidosperma viscidum. First instar larvae tunnel into the tiller where they feed internally on the tissues of the stem and leaf bases. Each larva attacks several tillers in this way. They then move to the soil and construct short, silk-lined tunnels from where they feed externally on the rhizomes of the food plant. The larva finally excavate a vertical tunnel to the soil surface and constructed a chimney of silk and dead leaf debris. Pupation takes place in the tunnel immediately beneath this chimney. The life cycle occupies two years but
in some instances may extend to three years.

References

Moths described in 1911
Castniidae